The Frank H. Stewart House is a historic house at 41 Montvale Road in Newton, Massachusetts.  The -story stucco-clad house was built in 1909 for Frank H. Stewart, a lawyer.  It is located in an Olmsted-designed subdivision, and is one Newton's finest large Classical Revival houses.  It has a green tile hipped roof with exposed rafter ends, pierced by three hip-roofed dormers.  The main facade has a front porch that merges into two flanking single-story projecting bays, all also topped by a green tile roof.  There are flanking side sections fronted by porches.

The house was listed on the National Register of Historic Places in 1990.

See also
 National Register of Historic Places listings in Newton, Massachusetts

References

Houses on the National Register of Historic Places in Newton, Massachusetts
Neoclassical architecture in Massachusetts
Houses completed in 1909